The Tucurá Fault is a thrust fault in the departments of Córdoba and Antioquia in northern Colombia. The fault is considered active because of three MW 5.7-6.7 earthquakes associated with the Tucurá Fault occurring in the twentieth century.

Etymology 
The fault is named after Tucurá.

Description 
The Tucura Fault is located in the northern part of the Central Ranges of the Colombian Andes, west of the Romeral Fault System. It extends from the Paderisco River in the south to the Sinú Valley in the north, where it crosses the Serranía de Abibe. The fault crosscuts middle and upper Tertiary folded marine sedimentary rocks and Quaternary alluvial deposits. There are strong linear features on the right margin of the Esmeralda and Sinú Rivers; these include fault saddles and slight slope changes in alluvial terraces. Tertiary rock units are thrust over Quaternary deposits and striae are found on the shear planes.

The fault is probably active with three earthquakes occurring in the twentieth century in the vicinity of the fault, February 12, 1952 (MW 6.7), December 3, 1970 (MW 5.7) and August 31, 1977 (MW 5.7).

See also 

 List of earthquakes in Colombia
 Unguía Fault
 Romeral Fault System

References

Bibliography

Further reading 
 

Seismic faults of Colombia
Thrust faults
Active faults
Faults
Faults
Earthquakes in Colombia